Corinth, Randolph County, Alabama may refer to:
 Corinth (north), Randolph County, Alabama
 Corinth (south), Randolph County, Alabama

See also
 Corinth, Alabama